Christopher J. Ferguson is an American psychologist who serves as a professor and co-chair of psychology at Stetson University in Florida. He previously served as an associate professor of psychology and criminal justice at Texas A&M International University. In 2014, he was named a fellow of the American Psychological Association. Ferguson is also a published author who has written both fiction and nonfiction.

Education
Ferguson received his B.A. in psychology from Stetson University, his M.S. in developmental psychology from Florida International University, and his Ph.D. in clinical psychology from the University of Central Florida.

Research and views
Ferguson is known for publishing studies disputing the link between video games and violent behavior. He has argued that violent video games have remained popular even while youth violence has fallen to a 40-year low. In 2008, Ferguson criticized a study published by Craig A. Anderson that found a link between violent video games and aggression. Ferguson stated, in a letter to the editor of Pediatrics, that the study suffered from "weak results" and "misleading conclusions". Ferguson published a study in 2014 that found that although there was a correlation between media violence and homicide rates for the mid-20th century, this correlation broke down after the 1950s.  He was recently an author in several papers, including two meta-analyses, arguing that the evidence against the use of physical punishment is exaggerated, and cautioning against the potential dangers of this.

Publications
In 2014, Ferguson published the novel Suicide Kings. His first nonfiction book, Moral Combat: Why the War on Violent Video Games Is Wrong, coauthored with Patrick M. Markey and published in 2017 by BenBella Books, addresses his views on the link between video games and violent behavior.
In 2020, Ferguson published How Madness Shaped History: An Eccentric Array of Maniacal Rulers, Raving Narcissists, and Psychotic Visionaries, which focuses on the way madness, or personality disorders, have affected a variety of global leaders and influential people throughout human history.
He has also written a number of short stories, some of which have been published in magazines or anthology collections.

References

External links
 
 Christopher Ferguson's faculty page

Living people
Stetson University faculty
21st-century American psychologists
Texas A&M International University faculty
Stetson University alumni
Florida International University alumni
University of Central Florida alumni
Fellows of the American Psychological Association
Year of birth missing (living people)